Schistophleps is a genus of moths in the family Erebidae first described by George Hampson in 1891.

Description
Palpi porrect (extending forward) and short. Antennae with swollen basal joint clothed with long scales. Tibia with short spurs. Forewings with vein 3 from before angle of cell. Vein 5 from near center of discocellulars. Vein 6 from upper angle and veins 7, 8 and 9, 10 stalked. Vein 11 anastomosing (fusing) with vein 12. There are three veinlets between vein 12 and the costa. Hindwings with vein 3 from before angle of cell and vein 5 from above angle. Veins 6 and 7 stalked and vein 8 from near end of cell.

Species
 Schistophleps albida Walker, 1864
 Schistophleps alluvifulvia Holloway, 2001
 Schistophleps bicolora Bethune-Baker, 1904
 Schistophleps bipuncta Hampson, 1891
 Schistophleps chamaitoides Rothschild, 1913
 Schistophleps costimacula Rothschild, 1913
 Schistophleps fulvia Hampson, 1900
 Schistophleps fulvioides Holloway, 2001
 Schistophleps hyalina Bethune-Baker, 1908
 Schistophleps irregularis Rothschild, 1916
 Schistophleps lobifulvia Holloway, 2001
 Schistophleps lofaushanensis Daniel, 1951
 Schistophleps major Roepke, 1946
 Schistophleps manusi Rothschild, 1916
 Schistophleps microfulvia Holloway, 2001
 Schistophleps minor Roepke, 1946
 Schistophleps mundata Reich, 1957
 Schistophleps nigropuncta Holloway, 2001
 Schistophleps noloides Rothschild, 1913
 Schistophleps obducta Lucas, 1893
 Schistophleps plagosus Rothschild, 1916
 Schistophleps punctifulvia Holloway, 2001
 Schistophleps pyrifulvia Holloway, 2001
 Schistophleps simillima Rothschild, 1913
 Schistophleps subtilis Holloway, 1979

References

Nudariina
Moth genera